Second Founding can refer to the following:
 African American founding fathers of the United States
The Second Founding is about a book by Eric Foner
Space Marine (Warhammer 40,000) is about a video game.